Political decorations of the Nazi Party were medals and awards issued by the National Socialist German Workers Party (NSDAP) between 1920 and 1945. Political awards were authorized for wear on any paramilitary uniform of Nazi Germany, as well as civilian attire, but were generally discouraged (but not forbidden) on Wehrmacht military uniforms. The Waffen-SS freely wore both political awards and military decorations on their uniforms. 

Civil decorations were considered the lowest order of medals, after military decorations and political decorations of the Nazi Party. Civil decorations were authorized for display on civilian clothing and paramilitary uniforms of the Nazi Party; however, their wear was often prohibited on active duty military uniforms of the Wehrmacht; the notable exception to this were sports badges, which were granted the same status as military qualification awards. 

The public wear of all Nazi Party awards was banned in Germany after 1945.

Political decorations
The various degrees of Nazi Party decorations were as follows:

German Order

This was the highest award that the Nazi Party could bestow on an individual. Adolf Hitler regarded this award as his personal decoration to be bestowed only upon those whose services to the state, party, and the people, he deemed worthy. There were eleven confirmed recipients of this award between 1942 and 1945.

Golden Party Badge

The first 100,000 members who had joined and had uninterrupted service in the Nazi Party were given the right to wear the Golden Party Badge (Goldenes Parteiabzeichen), shown above. Those badges had the recipient's membership number on the back (Adolf Hitler had badge #1). Other Golden Party Badges (with the initials A.H. on the back) were awarded at the discretion of Hitler to certain members of the party who merited special attention. An identical badge was awarded each year on 30 January to persons who had shown outstanding service to the Party or State.

Blood Order medal

The Blood Order, officially known as the "Decoration in Memory (of the Munich putsch) of 9 November 1923" (Medaille zur Erinnerung an den 9. November 1923), authorized by Hitler in March 1934, was one of the most prestigious decorations in the Nazi Party.

Party badges
 Coburg Badge (1922)
 Nuremberg Party Day Badge (1929)
 Brunswick Rally Badge (1931)
 Frontbann Badge
 Danzig Cross (awarded in 1st and 2nd class)
 NSDAP Long Service Award: Given in three grades; awarded for 10, 15, and 25 years of service
 Honour Chevron for the Old Guard: Designated those who joined the Party before Hitler became Chancellor. It was worn on the right sleeve.

The leaders of Nazi political districts (known as the Gauleiter) were empowered to bestow Gau Badges for a variety of services rendered to the local political organization. The badges were issued in Silver and Gold, with some in Bronze. They were rarely issued in Gold with Diamonds.

In November 1936, Hitler gave new "orders" as to the "Orders and Awards" of the Nazi Party to be bestowed. The top NSDAP awards are listed in the order: 1. Coburg Badge; 2. Nuremberg Party Day Badge; 3. Brunswick Rally Badge; 4. Golden Party Badge; 5. The Blood Order; followed by the Gau badges and the Golden Hitler Youth Badge.

SS and Police decorations

 SS Chevron for Former Police and Military
 SS Membership Runes for Order Police
 SS Long Service Award
 Police Long Service Award
 Totenkopf Ring
 SS Honor Sword
 SS Julleuchter
 SS Zivilabzeichen

Germanic-SS decorations

Awards specific to individual nationalistic Germanic-SS organizations were as follows:
 Germanic Proficiency Runes (bronze and silver)
 SS Sports Badge (Netherlands)
 SS Honor Sports Badge (Netherlands)
 Brave and Faithful Order (Norway)
 Førergarde Membership Badge (Norway)
 Front Fighters Badge (Norway)
  (Netherlands)
 Mussert-Garde Commemorative Pin (Netherlands)
 Schalburg Cross (Denmark)
 State Police Honor Cross (Norway)
 W.A. Sports Badge (Netherlands)

SA decorations
 SA Sports Badge (bronze, silver and gold)
 Service Entry Badge of Der Stahlhelm, Bund der Frontsoldaten

NSFK decorations

 The Free Balloon Pilot Badge
 The Motor Aircraft Pilot Badge (Das Abzeichen für Motorflugzeugführer) 
 The Large Glider Flyer Badge (Das Große Segelfliegerabzeichen)

Hitler Youth decorations
Hitler Youth awards were as follows: 
 Hitler Youth Badge (including versions in gold and with oakleaves)
 Hitler Youth Badge for Distinguished Foreigners
 Hitler Youth Leader's Sports Badge
 Hitler Youth Proficiency Badge
 Hitler Youth shooting badges

Other German sports decorations
 German Olympic Decoration (awarded in 1st and 2nd class)
 German Sports Badge
 Horseman's Badge
 Horse Driver's Badge

Civil awards
 German National Prize for Art and Science
 Badge for the Academy of Aeronautical Research
 National Senate of Culture Badge
 Goethe Medallion for Art and Science
 National Food Estate Medallion
 Social Welfare Decoration (awarded in 1st, 2nd and 3rd class)
 Medal of Social Welfare
 Faithful Service Medal (gold, silver and special class)
 Cross of Honor of the German Mother (bronze, silver, and gold)
 Lifesaving Medallion
 Fire Brigade Decoration (awarded in 1st and 2nd class)
 Mine Rescue Medal
 Civil Defense Decoration (awarded in 1st and 2nd class)
 War Merit Medal

Diplomatic awards
 Grand Cross of the Order of the German Eagle
 Special Grade Order of the German Eagle
 Order of the German Eagle (five classes)
 Medal of the Order of the German Eagle (bronze and silver)

All German Eagle decorations were awarded both with and without swords and could be upgraded to a gold version and also gold with diamonds. The German Eagle was intended as an award for foreigners while the Special Grade (without degree) was awarded to Germans.

Labor and trade decorations
 Pioneer of Labor Award
 Fritz Todt Award
 Reichsberufswettkampf
 Defense Economy Leader's Badge
 Customs Service Decoration
 Labor Service Ribbon (for 25, 18, 12, and 4 years of service)

German Red Cross awards

 German Red Cross Decoration (awarded in four classes)
 German Red Cross Medal

Notes

References

 
Civil awards and decorations of Germany
civil
de:Liste der Ehrenzeichen der NSDAP